Borowa  is a village in the administrative district of Gmina Gidle, within Radomsko County, Łódź Voivodeship, in central Poland.

The village has a population of 350.

References

Borowa